Please add names of notable painters with a Wikipedia page, in precise English alphabetical order, using U.S. spelling conventions. Country and regional names refer to where painters worked for long periods, not to personal allegiances.

Agnolo Gaddi (c. 1350 – 1396), Italian painter
Taddeo Gaddi (c. 1300 – 1366), Italian painter and architect
Gai Qi (改琦, 1774–1829), Chinese painter and poet
Thomas Gainsborough (1727–1788), English painter, draftsman and print-maker
Tamas Galambos (born 1939), Hungarian painter
Fede Galizia (1578–1630), Italian painter
Ellen Gallagher (born 1965), American painter, and film and video-maker
Akseli Gallen-Kallela (1865–1931), Finnish painter
Giovanni Antonio Galli (1585 – c. 1651), Italian painter
Byron Galvez (born 1941), Mexican painter and sculptor
Lattanzio Gambara (c. 1530 – 1574), Italian painter
Thomas Gambier Parry (1816–1888), English painter and art collector
Henry Snell Gamley (1865–1928), Scottish sculptor
Antonio de la Gandara (1861–1917), French painter, pastel painter and draftsman
Gang Hui-an (강희안, c. 1417–1464), Korean painter and scholar
Gang Se-hwang (강세황, 1713–1791), Korean painter, calligrapher and government official
Kishi Ganku (岸駒, 1756–1839), Japanese painter
Simon Gaon (born 1943), American painter
Gao Cen (高岑, died 1689), Chinese painter
Gao Fenghan (高鳳翰, 1683–1749), Chinese painter and poet
Gao Kegong (髙克恭, 1248–1310), Chinese painter and poet
Gao Qipei (高其佩, 1660–1734), Chinese artist
Gao Xiang (高翔, 1688–1753), Chinese painter
Daniel Garber (1880–1958), American painter
Víctor Manuel García Valdés (1897–1967), Cuban painter
Margaret Garland (1893–1976), English painter
David Garner (born 1958), Welsh installation artist
Joy Garnett (born 1960), American artist and writer
Meredith Garniss (born 1967), American visual artist and painter
Norman Garstin (1847–1926), Irish painter, teacher and critic
Lee Gatch (1902–1968), American artist
Gatōken Shunshi (画登軒春芝, fl. 1820–1828), Japanese designer of woodblock prints
Friedrich Gauermann (1807–1862), Austrian painter
Jakob Gauermann (1773–1843), German painter and engraver
Paul Gauguin (1848–1903), French artist
Giovanni Battista Gaulli (1639–1709), Italian painter
Robert Gavin (1827–1883), Scottish painter
Nikolai Ge (1831–1894), Russian painter
William Gear (1915–1997), Scottish painter
Andrew Geddes (1783–1844), Scottish/English painter and etcher
Margaret Geddes (1914–1998), English painter
Ilka Gedő (1921–1985), Hungarian painter and graphic artist
Geertgen tot Sint Jans (c. 1460 – c. 1490), Netherlandish painter
Alison Geissler (1907–2011), Scottish glass engraver
William Geissler (1894–1963), Scottish artist and wartime cartographer
Aert de Gelder (1645–1727), Dutch painter
Justus van Gent (1410–1480), Netherlandish/Italian painter
Nick Gentry (born 1980), English artist
Ivan Generalić (1914–1992), Yugoslav/Croatian painter
Artemisia Gentileschi (1593–1651), Italian painter
Orazio Gentileschi (1563–1639), Italian painter
Paul Georges (1923–2002), American painter
Aleksandr Gerasimov (1881–1963), Russian/Soviet painter
Fernando Gerassi (1899–1974), Turkish/American artist
Théodore Géricault (1791–1824), French painter and lithographer
Abdullah Gërguri (1931–1994), Yugoslav/Kosovar painter and restorer
Jean-Léon Gérôme (1824–1904), French painter and sculptor
Kaff Gerrard (1894–1970), English painter and potter
Wojciech Gerson (1831–1901), Polish painter
Richard Gerstl (1883–1908), Austrian painter and draftsman
Mark Gertler (1891–1939), English painter
Solomon Gessner (1730–1788), Swiss painter, graphic artist and poet
Cristache Gheorghiu (born 1937), Romanian/Greek painter and writer
Jacob de Gheyn II (1565–1629), Dutch painter and engraver
Domenico Ghirlandaio (1449–1494), Italian Renaissance
Ridolfo Ghirlandaio (1483–1561), Italian painter
Alberto Giacometti (1901–1966), Swiss sculptor, painter and draftsman
Diego Giacometti (1902–1985), Swiss sculptor and designer
Giovanni Giacometti (1868–1933), Swiss painter
Khalil Gibran (1883–1931), Lebanese/American visual artist and poet
David Cooke Gibson (1827–1856), Scottish painter and poet
John Gibson (1790–1866), Welsh/Italian sculptor
Stefan Gierowski (1925–2022), Polish painter
Harald Giersing (1881–1927), Danish painter
Aleksander Gierymski (1850–1901), Polish painter
Maksymilian Gierymski (1846–1874), Polish watercolor painter
Sanford Robinson Gifford (1823–1880), American landscape painter
H. R. Giger (born 1940), Swiss painter
Araceli Gilbert (1913–1993), Ecuadorian artist
Stephen Gilbert (1910–2007), Scottish painter and sculptor
James Giles (1801–1870), Scottish painter
Colin Gill (1892–1940), English mural and portrait painter
Gregory Gillespie (1936–2000), American magic realist painter
James Gillick (born 1972), English painter and applied artist
William George Gillies (1898–1973), Scottish painter
Harold Gilman (1945–2000), English painter
Aleksander Gine (1830–1980), Russian painter
Phyllis Ginger (1907–2005), English artist and illustrator
Charles Ginner (1878–1952), English painter
Giorgione (c. 1477 – 1510), Italian painter
Giotto (1267–1337), Italian painter and architect
Frank J. Girardin (1856–1945), American artist and baseball player
François Girardon (1628–1715), French sculptor
Marie-Suzanne Giroust (1734–1772), French painter, miniaturist and pastellist
Fritz Glarner (1899–1972), Swiss/American painter
Ilya Glazunov (1930–2017), Soviet/Russian artist and academy rector
Albert Gleizes (1881–1953), French artist and theorist
Charles Gleyre (1806–1874), French artist and teacher
Oton Gliha (1914–1999), Yugoslav/Croatian artist
John William Godward (1861–1922), English painter
Hugo van der Goes (1440–1483), Flemish painter
Leo Goetz (1883–1962), German painter
Vincent van Gogh (1853–1890), Dutch painter
Elias Goldberg (1886–1978), American painter
Michael Goldberg (1924–2007) American artist
Hilde Goldschmidt (1897–1980), German painter and print-maker
E. William Gollings (1878–1932), American painter
Leon Golub (1922–2004), American painter
Hendrik Goltzius (1558–1617), Dutch print-maker, draftsman and painter
Nuno Gonçalves (fl. 1450–1471), Portuguese court painter
Natalia Goncharova (1881–1962), Russian/Soviet painter, writer and illustrator
Gong Kai (龔開, 1222–1307), Chinese painter and government official
Gong Xian (龔賢, 1618–1689), Chinese painter
Eva Gonzalès (1849–1883), French painter
Julio González (sculptor) (1876–1942), Spanish sculptor and painter
Carl Arnold Gonzenbach (1806–1885), Swiss painter
Frederick Goodall (1822–1904), English artist
Robert Goodnough (1917–2010), American painter
Hilda May Gordon (1874–1972), English watercolor painter
John Watson Gordon (1788–1864), Scottish painter and Royal Scottish Academy President
Constance Gordon-Cumming (1837–1924), Scottish painter and travel writer
Spencer Gore (1878–1914), English painter
Arshile Gorky (1904–1948) American artist
Maria Johanna Görtz (1783–1853), Swedish painter
Jan Gossaert (c. 1478 – 1532), Netherlandish/French painter and draftsman
Caroline Gotch (1854–1945), English painter
Adolph Gottlieb (1903–1974) American artist
Leopold Gottlieb (1879–1934), Polish painter
Maurycy Gottlieb (1856–1879), Polish painter
Karl Otto Götz (born 1914), German artist, draftsman and art professor
Hendrick Goudt (1583–1648), Dutch painter, print-maker and draftsman
Tom Gourdie (1913–2005), Scottish artist, calligrapher and teacher
Francisco Josè de Goya (1746–1828), Spanish painter and print-maker
Jan van Goyen (1596–1656), Dutch landscape painter
Goyō Hashiguchi (橋口五葉, 1880–1921), Japanese artist
Igor Grabar (1871–1960), Russian painter, restorer and historian of art
Anton Graff (1736–1813), Swiss portrait artist
Peter Benjamin Graham (1925–1987), Australian visual artist, printer, and art theorist
Eugenio Granell (1912–2001), Spanish artist, musician and writer
Duncan Grant (1885–1978), Scottish painter and designer
James Ardern Grant (1887–1973), English painter and print-maker
Mary Grant (1831–1908), Scottish/English sculptor
Eugène Grasset (1845–1917), Swiss decorative artist
Enrique Grau (1920–2004), Colombian artist
Nancy Graves (1939–1995), American sculptor, painter and print-maker
Alasdair Gray (1934–2019), Scottish artist and writer
Cleve Gray (1918–2004), American painter
Norah Neilson Gray (1882–1931), Scottish painter
Edmund Greacen (1877–1949), American painter
Pieter de Grebber (1600–1653), Dutch painter
El Greco (1541–1614), Greek/Spanish painter, sculptor and architect
Art Green (born 1941), American artist
Balcomb Greene (1904–1990), American artist and teacher
Gertrude Greene (1904–1956), American sculptor and painter
Stephen Greene (1917–1999), American artist
Barbara Greg (1900–1983), English painter and illustrator
Jan Gregoor (1914–1982), Dutch painter and art educator
Louis Grell (1887–1960), American artist
HAP Grieshaber (1908–1981), German artist and woodcut maker
Jan Griffier (1652–1718), Dutch/English painter
Robert Griffier (1688–1750), English/Dutch painter
Gwenny Griffiths (1867–1953), Welsh painter
Samuel Hieronymus Grimm (1733–1794), Swiss landscape artist
Alexis Grimou (1678–1733), French portrait painter
John Atkinson Grimshaw (1836–1893), English artist
Juan Gris (1887–1927), Spanish/French painter
Giuseppe Grisoni (1699–1796), Italian painter and sculptor
Konrad Grob (1828–1904), Swiss painter
Pieter Anthonisz. van Groenewegen (1600–1658), Dutch landscape painter
Ivan Grohar (1867–1911), Austro-Hungarian (Slovene) painter
Mary Elizabeth Groom (1903–1958), English print-maker and book illustrator
Catrin G Grosse (born 1964), German painter, graphic designer and sculptor
George Grosz (1893–1959), German artist and caricaturist
Artur Grottger (1837–1867), Polish painter and graphic artist
Hugo Kārlis Grotuss (1884–1951), Russian/Latvian painter
Richard Gruelle (1851–1914), American painter, illustrator and author
Ernő Grünbaum (1908–1944/1945), Hungarian painter, draftsman and Holocaust victim
Isaac Grünewald (1889–1946), Swedish painter
Matthias Grünewald (1470–1528), German religious painter
Eduard von Grützner (1846–1925), German painter and art professor
Gu An (顧安, 1289–1365), Chinese painter
Gu Hongzhong (顧閎中, 937–975), Chinese painter
Gu Kaizhi (顧愷之, 344–406), Chinese painter and politician
Gu Zhengyi (顧正誼, fl. between 14th and 16th cc.), Chinese painter
Guan Daosheng (管道昇, 1262–1319) Chinese painter and poet
Francesco Guardi (1712–1793), Italian painter
Oswaldo Guayasamín (1919–1999), Ecuadorian painter and sculptor
Max Gubler (1898–1973), Swisss artist
Hans Gude (1825–1903), Norwegian painter
Paul Guigou (1834–1871), French landscape painter
Albert Guillaume (1873–1942), French painter and caricaturist
Armand Guillaumin (1841–1927), French painter and lithographer
Lajos Gulácsy (1882–1932), Hungarian painter
Genco Gulan (born 1969), Turkish painter and sculptor
Olaf Gulbransson (1873–1958), Norwegian artist, painter and designer
Ismail Gulgee (1926–2007), Indian/Pakistani painter
Herbert James Gunn (1893–1964), Scottish painter
Guo Chun (郭純, 1370–1444), Chinese painter
Guo Xi (郭熙, 1020–1090), Chinese landscape painter
Nazmi Ziya Güran (1881–1937), Turkish painter and art teacher
Elena Guro (1877–1913), Russian painter and writer
Alfred Richard Gurrey, Sr. (1852–1944), American landscape painter 
Ella Guru (born 1966), American painter and musician
Philip Guston (1913–1980), American artist
Gusukuma Seihō (城間清豊, 1614–1644), Japanese court painter
Albert Paris Gütersloh (1887–1973), Austro-Hungarian/Austrian painter and writer
James Guthrie (1859–1930), Scottish painter
Kathleen Guthrie (1905–1981), English painter
Robin Guthrie (1902–1971), English painter
Judith Gutierrez (1927–2003), Ecuadorian/Mexican painter
Werner Gutzeit (1932–2014), Danish/German painter and designer
Jenő Gyárfás (1857–1925), Hungarian painter, graphic artist and writer
Líviusz Gyulai (born 1937), Romanian (Hungarian) graphic artist, print-maker and illustrator

References
References can be found under each entry.

G